The 2014 Travelers Curling Club Championship was held from November 24 to 29 at the Mayflower Curling Club in Halifax, Nova Scotia.

Men

Teams
The teams are listed as follows:

Round Robin Standings

Grey pool

Red pool

Playoffs

Semifinals
Friday, November 28, 7:00 pm

Final
Saturday, November 29, 9:00 am

Women

Teams
The teams are listed as follows:

Round Robin Standings

Grey pool

Red pool

Playoffs

Semifinals
Friday, November 28, 7:00 pm

Final
Saturday, November 29, 9:00 am

References

External links

 
Travelers Curling Club Championship
Travelers Curling Club Championship
Travelers Curling Club Championship
Canadian Curling Club Championships
Travelers Curling Club Championship